Haim Nurieli (1 May 1943 – 14 September 2022) was an Israeli footballer. He played in three matches for the Israel national football team from 1965 to 1968.

References

External links
 

1943 births
2022 deaths
Living people
Israeli footballers
Footballers from Tel Aviv
Hapoel Tel Aviv F.C. players
Shimshon Tel Aviv F.C. players
AFC Ajax players
Israeli expatriate footballers
Expatriate footballers in the Netherlands
Israeli expatriate sportspeople in the Netherlands
Israel international footballers
1968 AFC Asian Cup players
Association football midfielders